Acta Victoriana is the literary journal of Victoria University, Toronto. It was founded in May 1878 and is the oldest continuous university publication in Canada; its 146th volume was published in 2022. It is published twice a year. Though originally a 'review' of Victoria University life with a few pages reserved for creative work, over the years it has shifted its focus to become a book of short fiction and poetry. Acta Victoriana publishes at Coach House Press.

Selected past contributors and editors
The following is a list of the selected former contributors and editors of Acta Victoriana.
 Margaret Atwood
 Margaret Avison
 John Bemrose
 Wilfred Campbell
 George Elliott Clarke
 Northrop Frye
 David Gilmour
 Sandy Johnson
 Jim Johnstone
 Archibald Lampman
 Irving Layton
 Dennis Lee
 Robert McConnell
 Bruce Meyer
 A. F. Moritz
 Lester B. Pearson
 E. J. Pratt
 Al Purdy
 Charles G. D. Roberts
 Radoslav Rochallyi
 Duncan Campbell Scott
 Clifford Sifton
 Goldwin Smith

References

External links
 Research Guide to Acta Victoriana (Victoria University Library in the University of Toronto)

Poetry magazines published in Canada
Quarterly magazines published in Canada
Magazines established in 1878
Magazines published in Toronto
University of Toronto